Cecil Patterson may refer to:
 Cecil Patterson (bishop), Anglican bishop
 Cecil Frederick Patterson, Canadian horticulturalist
 Cecil T. Patterson, American karateka